X90 may refer to

Car models
Suzuki X-90
X90, the Toyota Cresta model from 1992 to 1996
X90, the Toyota Mark II model sold in Japan from 1992 to 1996

Bus routes
X90, an Oxford to London coach route, England
X90 (New York City bus)

Other
Pentax X90, predecessor to the Pentax X-5 camera
Vivo X90, smartphone by Vivo